DeathKeep is a 1995 video game based on the Dungeons & Dragons fantasy role-playing game. It was released for the 3DO console, and later converted to the PC. The game is a sequel to Advanced Dungeons & Dragons: Slayer.

Plot
The player character enters a vast castle which has been taken over by an evil necromancer, and must explore the place in search of three orbs which are used to defeat the powerful spellcaster.

Gameplay
DeathKeep is a first-person dungeon crawler where the player can choose to play a dwarven fighter, an elven mage, or a half-elf fighter-mage.

Reception

Reviewing the 3DO version, a critic for Next Generation praised the graphical textures but said the game is frustratingly difficult, particularly criticizing the imprecise controls when making the character come to a stop and the need to pass over some objects multiple times before the game registers the contact. However, he concluded, "While these aren't minor problems, the dungeons are ingeniously designed, the game is huge, and on the whole, it's interesting enough to warrant a look in spite of the annoyances." GamePros The Game Elf gave it a rave review, applauding the huge amount of content, accessible menus, "smooth" control, rendered graphics with fully 3D point-of-view, detailed visuals, and "unnerving" sound effects. He concluded, "With a solid plot and great animation, Death Keep is to die for."

Andy Butcher reviewed the PC version of Deathkeep for Arcane magazine. He commented that "the original version for the 3DO console was less than inspiring, and this substandard conversion to the PC is even less so". Butcher concluded, "Unfortunately, Deathkeep suffers from awful graphics, low-quality sound and uninspiring gameplay, all of which combine to create one of the worst games released on the PC in some time. Try as you might, there's simply nothing you can find to recommend it. If you want a fast-paced fantasy game that's heavy on the combat and light on the rules, Hexen is infinitely better than this". A Next Generation critic similarly said that the 3DO version was passable but the PC conversion is poor, with "jerky play control, blocky and pixelated graphics, and awkward keyboard configuration".

According to GameSpy, DeathKeep was "the last Dungeons & Dragons game for SSI, and it was a pretty ignominious end for a pretty distinguished run".

References

1995 video games
3DO Interactive Multiplayer games
Dungeons & Dragons video games
Role-playing video games
Strategic Simulations games
Video game sequels
Video games developed in the United States
Video games featuring female protagonists
Video games set in castles
Windows games